Stand in Line is the first studio album by heavy metal band Impellitteri, released in 1988 through Relativity Records; a remastered edition was issued on May 19, 2009 through EMI Records, containing four bonus tracks which originally formed their 1987 EP Impellitteri. The album reached number 91 on the U.S. Billboard 200 and remained on that chart for twenty weeks.

After recording the album, bassist Chuck Wright (who left to form House of Lords) and drummer Pat Torpey (who left to form Mr. Big) were replaced for the supporting tour and videos by bassist Dave Spitz and drummer Stet Howland.

Critical reception

Whitney Z. Gomes at AllMusic awarded Stand in Line four stars out of five, listing "Secret Lover", "Tonight I Fly", "Goodnight and Goodbye" and the title track as highlights. He mainly praised singer Graham Bonnet's vocals throughout the album, but heavily criticized the guitarist and bandleader Chris Impellitteri's cover versions of "Since You Been Gone" and "Over the Rainbow" as "excessive and useless", writing that they "almost [run] the record into the ground". Further criticism was directed at the album's mixing and production, but he concluded by saying, "When Stand in Line works, it rules."

Track listing

Personnel
Chris Impellitteri – guitar, production
Graham Bonnet – vocals
Phil Wolfe – keyboard
Pat Torpey – drums
Chuck Wright – bass (except track 2)
Randy Rand – bass (track 2)
Bill Freesh – engineering, mixing
Mikey Davis – engineering
Brian Jenkins – engineering assistance
Paul Winger – engineering assistance
Bob Ludwig – mastering
Cliff Cultreri – executive production

Chart performance

References

Impellitteri albums
1988 albums
Relativity Records albums
Albums recorded at Sound City Studios